is a railway station on the West Japan Railway Company (JR West) JR Tōzai Line in Fukushima-ku, Osaka, Osaka Prefecture, Japan.

Connecting lines from Ebie
Hanshin Railway Main Line: Noda Station
Osaka Metro Sennichimae Line: Nodahanshin Station (S11)

Layout
There is an island platform with two tracks on the second floor below ground.

Surroundings
the headquarters of Hanshin Electric Railway Co., Ltd.
WISTE

History 
Ebie Station opened on 8 March 1997, coinciding with the opening of the JR Tōzai Line between Kyobashi and Amagasaki.

Station numbering was introduced in March 2018 with Ebie being assigned station number JR-H46.

Adjacent stations

References 

Fukushima-ku, Osaka
Railway stations in Osaka